The First Team (stylised as The F1rst Team) is a British comedy television series, created by Damon Beesley and Iain Morris, both well known for their work on The Inbetweeners. The series follows the lives of  Mattie Sullivan (Jake Short), Benji Achebe (Shaquille Ali-Yebuah) and Jack Turner (Jack McMullen), who are young players of a fictional Premier League football team.

Produced by BBC Studios and the creators' production company Fudge Park Productions, the sole series began broadcasting on BBC Two on 28 May 2020, consisting of six episodes, concluding on 2 July the same year. The series received underwhelming reviews by critics.

Plot
Focusing on the lives of young players Mattie, Jack and Benji, the show follows the trio as they contend with the manifold issues on and off the field that are associated with modern-day football. One of the overriding themes of the show, according to Beesley, is the "fault lines, where masculinity and insecurity collide".

Cast and characters

Main
Jake Short as Mattie Sullivan
Shaquille Ali-Yebuah as Benji Achebe
Jack McMullen as Jack Turner
Will Arnett as Mark Crane
Chris Geere  as Chris Booth
Theo Barklem-Biggs as Petey Brooks
Tamla Kari as Olivia Talbot

Recurring
Paolo Sassanelli as Cesare
Jason Williamson as Kitman Martin
Vadhir Derbez as Carlos Velez
Ossian Perret as Pascal
Phil Wang as Brian
Marek Larwood as Holehead
Joe Sims as Paul Williamson
Neil Fitzmaurice as Darren Turner
Marvin Brown as Bootz

Guest
Gary Lineker as himself
Alan Shearer as himself 
 Ian Wright as himself 
Jürgen Klopp as himself
Sally Nugent as herself
Jonathan Pearce as himself 
Paul Hawksbee as himself 
Andy Jacobs as himself

Production

Development
The series was created by Damon Beesley and Iain Morris, who were notable for producing the famous E4 comedy television series The Inbetweeners. The series, entitled The First Team, was reported to be focused on the lives of players in a fictional Premier League football team, similar to the format of former ITV drama television programme Footballers' Wives. The programme's crew was mainly made up of former members of The Inbetweeners crew, with Beesley and Morris' self-constructed production company Fudge Park Productions collaborating with BBC Studios to produce the series.

Casting
In September 2019, the cast was confirmed, with Jake Short, Shaquille Ali-Yebuah and Jack McMullen set to star. This was the first British production in which Short had appeared - he was previously known for his work for Disney Channel in the United States (although Short's previous Disney Channel appearances had been broadcast to viewers in the British Isles on Disney Channel UK and Ireland and Disney XD UK and Ireland respectively). It was Ali-Yebuah's first lead role in both television and film.

Theo Barklem-Biggs and Tamla Kari were cast in supporting roles, both having appeared in previous Beesley and Morris projects: Barklem-Biggs in The Inbetweeners Movie and Kari in both this and The Inbetweeners 2. Other notable cast members included Will Arnett, Phil Wang and Neil Fitzmaurice.

Filming
The series was filmed across the United Kingdom. The football stadium and training complex was filmed at Charlton Athletic Football Club's facilities: The Valley and their Sparrows Lane training complex. Furthermore, a fan of the programme stated that they had witnessed the programme also being filmed in a local Charlton pub named The Rose of Denmark.

When filming in Chester, England international footballer Raheem Sterling was seen at the same Costco store where the crew were filming. It appeared that Sterling was a friend of Shaquille Ali-Yebuah, who portrays the role of Benji Achebe. The scenes where the three main characters visit Petey Brooks's (Theo Barklem-Biggs) home was filmed at a private residence in Sevenoaks, Kent.

Episodes

Reception
The show received mixed reviews after its release, being dubbed "a football sitcom fit for relegation", with 2/5 star reviews in both The Guardian and The Radio Times. The review from The Evening Standard, however, was more positive, asserting that despite a slow start, by episode two, the series "feels a lot more confident and funny".

See also
 Ted Lasso, American sitcom featuring an American manager who joins a Premier League club

References

External links
 
 
 

2020 British television series debuts
2020 British television series endings
2020s British sitcoms
BBC television sitcoms
Fictional association football television series
English-language television shows
Television series by BBC Studios